Virgilio Maroso (26 June 1925 – 4 May 1949) was an Italian football player, who played as a defender for Torino FC and died in the Superga air disaster together with nearly the whole Grande Torino team.

Biography
Maroso was born in Marostica, in the province of Vicenza. He was the brother of Pietro Maroso (1934–2012), also a Serie A player and honorary president of A.S. Varese.

Club career
Maroso played as a defender. After a period on loan at Alessandria (1944), he made his club debut with Torino on 14 October 1945, in a 2–1 defeat to rivals Juventus in the Turin Derby. In total, he played 103 times for Torino in league matches, scoring once, and won four consecutive Serie A (scudetti) titles between 1945 and 1949.

International career
At international level, he was capped seven times for the Italian national team between 1945 and 1949, scoring one goal. His debut came on 11 November 1945, in a 4–4 draw against Switzerland.

Style of play
A promising and highly talented player, Maroso was a precocious full-back, who is considered to be one of the best Italian players ever in his position, and is even rated by some pundits in the sport to be Italy's greatest left-back ever. A fast, powerful, elegant, and technically gifted offensive-minded left-back, who was known for his flair and touch on the ball, Maroso was one of the first ever attacking full-backs in football, and was even capable of playing as a winger due to his ability to get up the flank; although he stood out for his attacking prowess, he was also strong defensively, courtesy of his foot-work and anticipation, and was capable of playing with either foot. In addition to his playing ability, he also stood out for his correct behaviour and fair-play on the pitch, and rarely gave away fouls; despite his skill, however, he was also injury-prone.

Death and legacy
Maroso died with most of the Grande Torino team in the Superga air disaster near Turin, on 4 May 1949. 

The football stadium in his home-town of Marostica is dedicated to him.

Honours

Club
Torino
Serie A (4): 1945–46, 1946–47, 1947–48, 1948–49

Individual
Torino F.C. Hall of Fame: 2014

External links
Statistics at Enciclopedia del Calcio website 
Statistics at FIGC website

References

1925 births
1949 deaths
Sportspeople from the Province of Vicenza
Association football fullbacks
Italian footballers
Torino F.C. players
U.S. Alessandria Calcio 1912 players
Serie A players
Italy international footballers
Footballers killed in the Superga air disaster
Footballers from Veneto